Béla Szabados (born February 18, 1974 in Békéscsaba) is a former freestyle swimmer from Hungary, who competed in two consecutive Summer Olympics for his native country, starting in 1992. He studied at the University of Southern California.  Szabados continues to compete as a Masters swimmer, representing West Loop Athletic Club in Chicago, IL.  He has set two Illinois Masters Swimming records in the 35-39 age group.

External links
Profile on FINA-website
ILMSA Records

1974 births
Living people
Hungarian male swimmers
Olympic swimmers of Hungary
Hungarian male freestyle swimmers
Swimmers at the 1992 Summer Olympics
Swimmers at the 1996 Summer Olympics
Swimmers at the 2000 Summer Olympics
Medalists at the FINA World Swimming Championships (25 m)
European Aquatics Championships medalists in swimming
Universiade medalists in swimming
Universiade gold medalists for Hungary
Universiade silver medalists for Hungary
Medalists at the 1997 Summer Universiade
People from Békéscsaba
Sportspeople from Békés County